Franco Ianeselli (5 August 1978) is an Italian politician and former trade unionist.

Career
From 2015 to 2020 he was general secretary of CGIL of Trentino.

At the 2020 Italian local elections he was elected Mayor of Trento with a centre-left coalition, and took office on 23 September 2020.

References

External links

 

1978 births
Living people
Mayors of Trento
Italian trade unionists